Chelmen Sang or Chelmeh Sang may refer to:
 Chelmen Sang-e Olya
 Chelmen Sang-e Sofla